Of Doom and Death is the second full-length album by the German power metal band Savage Circus. It was released on October 23, 2009 via Dockyard 1 Records.

Track listing
All music and lyrics written by Savage Circus

Credits
Jens Carlsson – lead vocals
Emil Norberg – guitar
Piet Sielck – guitar, backing vocals
Yenz Leonhardt – bass guitar, backing vocals
Mike Terrana – drums

References

2009 albums
Savage Circus albums